Football Club Kremin Kremenchuk is a professional football club based in Kremenchuk, Ukraine. The current club is administered by the city of Kremenchuk and was established in 2003, but it traces its heritage to the previously existing clubs of 1959–1970 and 1985–2001.

FC Dnipro Kremenchuk (1959–1970) became the first club from Kremenchuk that obtained the professional status (team of masters). The club only played for six seasons in the Soviet lower leagues before it was dissolved. In 1985 there was created by Soviet truck manufacturer KrAZ FC Kremin which with dissolution of the Soviet Union played for several seasons at the top level in Ukraine.

Soon after liquidation of the club, in 2003 the city council adopted a decision to revive similar club financed from a local budget. Since the 2005–06 season, the city's club has taken part in the Ukrainian Second League replacing another team Vorskla-2 Poltava. The club now plays in Ukrainian First League after reaching promotion in the 2018–19 season. After 2017–18 season MFC Kremin is the longest existing professional club in Kremenchuk.

History
The Soviet club was established in 1959 by the Kremenchuk factory of road equipment "Kredmash" as Dnipro Kremenchuk (Dnyepr Kremenchug) and entered the Soviet football competitions in the Class B (the 3rd tier). The club participated in 10 seasons and once it was promoted to the second group of Class A (the 2nd tier). During that time the team was coached by Borys Usenko. In 1970, the club has folded.

In 1985, the club was reestablished when Naftovyk Kremenchuk was merged with SC KrAZ Kremenchuk. Naftovyk Kremenchuk was sponsored by the Kremenchuk Oil Refinery, while SC KrAZ Kremenchuk was a sports club of the Ukrainian truck builder AutoKrAZ. The new club under the name Kremin has won the Soviet amateur football competition in 1988 and the next year entered the Soviet Second League competitions.

From 1992 to 1997, Kremin has played in the Ukrainian Premier League after being initially chosen to participate for being one of the top 9 (of 11) Ukrainian teams from the West Zone of the Soviet Second League in 1991. Kremin spent the next two seasons after that in Ukrainian First League and was demoted further to Ukrainian Second League in 1999. Soon after that the club folded and ceased to exist.

In 2003, the city authorities of Kremenchuk decided to reanimate the club once again. For the first two seasons Kremin played in the Poltava Oblast Championship and in the 2005–06 season it joined once again with the new name MFC Kremin Krimenchuk.

Kremin Kremenchuk's best achievement in the Ukrainian Premier League was 9th place (twice, in 1992–93 and 1995–96), while reaching the semi-finals in the Ukrainian National Cup in 1996.

MFC Kremin Kremenchuk changed its name to FC Kremin Kremenchuk before the start of the 2020–21 season.

Crest and colours

Home colors are blue shirts, blue shorts, and blue socks.
Away uniforms are white shirts, white shorts, and white socks.

The team kits are produced by Puma AG and the shirt sponsor is Kremenchukmyaso.

Since the club's foundation, Kremin has had five main crests.

Stadium

From its inception the team played at the Polytechnic Stadium, however, that stadium has fallen into disrepair, and after one season of play at Yunist Stadium in Komsomolsk, the team have moved into their brand new stadium. City officials built FC Kremin Stadium which has covered stands for 1500 spectators and artificial pitch surface.

Players

Managers

 Hryhoriy Myroshnyk (1960)
 Borys Usenko (1967)
 Yosyp Liftshyts (1968)
 Borys Usenko (1969)
 Viktor Berest (1986)
 Viktor Fomin (1987)
 Yevhen Kaminskyi (1988–1989)
 Valeriy Lulko (1989)
 Yuriy Zakharov (1990–1991)
 Volodymyr Lozynskyi (1992)
 Boris Streltsov (1992–1993)
 Tiberiy Korponay (1993)
 Evhen Rudakov (1994)
 Tiberiy Korponay (1994–1995)
 Anatoliy Skurskyi (1995)   
 Valery Yaremchenko (1996)
 Mykhailo Byelykh (1996–1997)
 Yuriy Koval (1997–1998)
 Semen Osynovskyi (1999–2000)
 Serhiy Svystun (2004–2008)
 Yuriy Chumak (2008–2013)
 Serhiy Svystun (2013–2015)
 Serhiy Yashchenko (2015–2018)
 Ihor Stolovytskyi (2018–2019)
 Volodymyr Prokopynenko (2019–2020)
 Serhiy Svystun (2020)
 Oleksandr Holovko (2020)
 Oleksiy Hodin (2021–present)

League and cup history

Dnipro (1959–1970)
The club was named Torpedo for the 1959 season. Dnipro was sponsored by the Kremenchuk Factory of Road Equipment "Kredmash". Since 1963, it participated at the professional level.
{|class="wikitable"
|-bgcolor="#efefef"
! Season
! Div.
! Pos.
! Pl.
! W
! D
! L
! GS
! GA
! P
!Domestic Cup
!colspan=2|Europe
!Notes
|-
|align=center|1963
|align=center rowspan=7|3rd
|align=center|20
|align=center|38
|align=center|5
|align=center|8
|align=center|25
|align=center|32
|align=center|82
|align=center|14
|align=center|
|align=center|
|align=center|
|align=center|Ukraine Zone 1
|-
|align=center rowspan=2|1965
|align=center|5
|align=center|30
|align=center|9
|align=center|13
|align=center|8
|align=center|21
|align=center|21
|align=center|31
|align=center rowspan=2|1/8 finals
|align=center rowspan=2|
|align=center rowspan=2|
|align=center|Ukraine Zone 1
|-
|align=center|4
|align=center|10
|align=center|3
|align=center|3
|align=center|4
|align=center|9
|align=center|9
|align=center|9
|align=center|Play-off
|-
|align=center rowspan=2|1966
|align=center bgcolor=tan|3
|align=center|38
|align=center|19
|align=center|12
|align=center|7
|align=center|44
|align=center|26
|align=center|50
|align=center rowspan=2|Winners (Zone 2)
|align=center rowspan=2|
|align=center rowspan=2|
|align=center|Ukraine Zone 2
|-
|align=center|X
|align=center|2
|align=center|0
|align=center|1
|align=center|1
|align=center|1
|align=center|4
|align=center|1
|align=center|Play-off lost
|-
|align=center rowspan=2|1967
|align=center bgcolor=tan|3
|align=center|40
|align=center|22
|align=center|6
|align=center|12
|align=center|51
|align=center|33
|align=center|50
|align=center rowspan=2|1/16 finals
|align=center rowspan=2|
|align=center rowspan=2|
|align=center|Ukraine Zone 2
|-
|align=center bgcolor=tan|3
|align=center|5
|align=center|2
|align=center|1
|align=center|2
|align=center|2
|align=center|2
|align=center|5
|align=center bgcolor=green|Play-off, Promoted
|-
|align=center rowspan=2|1968
|align=center rowspan=2|2nd
|align=center|18
|align=center|40
|align=center|7
|align=center|14
|align=center|19
|align=center|23
|align=center|46
|align=center|28
|align=center rowspan=2|1/64 finals
|align=center rowspan=2|
|align=center rowspan=2|
|align=center|USSR II Group
|-
|align=center|4
|align=center|5
|align=center|2
|align=center|1
|align=center|2
|align=center|5
|align=center|4
|align=center|5
|align=center bgcolor=pink|Play-off, Relegated
|-
|align=center|1969
|align=center|3rd
|align=center|5
|align=center|40
|align=center|17
|align=center|15
|align=center|8
|align=center|45
|align=center|27
|align=center|49
|align=center|
|align=center|
|align=center|
|align=center|Ukraine Zone 1
|}

Kremin (1985–2001)
The club was created out of the team of Kremenchuk Oil Refinery Plant, FC Naftovyk Kremin and SC KrAZ, sponsored by the AutoKrAZ.

Soviet championship (1985–1991)
{|class="wikitable"
|-bgcolor="#efefef"
! Season
! Div.
! Pos.
! Pl.
! W
! D
! L
! GS
! GA
! P
!Domestic Cup
!colspan=2|Europe
!Notes
|-bgcolor=SteelBlue
|align=center|1988
|align=center|4th
|align=center|1
|align=center|5
|align=center|4
|align=center|0
|align=center|1
|align=center|12
|align=center|7
|align=center|8
|align=center|
|align=center|
|align=center|
|align=center|Final group
|-bgcolor=PowderBlue
|align=center|1989
|align=center rowspan=3|3rd
|align=center|6
|align=center|52
|align=center|21
|align=center|18
|align=center|13
|align=center|59
|align=center|50
|align=center|60
|align=center|
|align=center|
|align=center|
|align=center|VI Zone
|-bgcolor=PowderBlue
|align=center|1990
|align=center|10
|align=center|42
|align=center|16
|align=center|11
|align=center|15
|align=center|49
|align=center|45
|align=center|43
|align=center|
|align=center|
|align=center|
|align=center|West Zone
|-bgcolor=PowderBlue
|align=center|1991
|align=center|13
|align=center|42
|align=center|16
|align=center|9
|align=center|17
|align=center|56
|align=center|50
|align=center|41
|align=center|
|align=center|
|align=center|
|align=center|West Zone
|}

Ukrainian championship (1992–2001)

{|class="wikitable"
|-bgcolor="#efefef"
! Season
! Div.
! Pos.
! Pl.
! W
! D
! L
! GS
! GA
! P
!Domestic Cup
!colspan=2|Europe
!Notes
|-
|align=center|1992
|align=center rowspan=6|1st
|align=center|7
|align=center|18
|align=center|4
|align=center|8
|align=center|6
|align=center|17
|align=center|23
|align=center|16
|align=center| finals
|align=center|
|align=center|
|align=center|Group A
|-
|align=center|1992–93
|align=center|9
|align=center|30
|align=center|8
|align=center|11
|align=center|11
|align=center|23
|align=center|40
|align=center|27
|align=center| finals
|align=center|
|align=center|
|align=center|
|-
|align=center|1993–94
|align=center|15
|align=center|34
|align=center|9
|align=center|8
|align=center|17
|align=center|26
|align=center|39
|align=center|26
|align=center| finals
|align=center|
|align=center|
|align=center|
|-
|align=center|1994–95
|align=center|10
|align=center|34
|align=center|12
|align=center|6
|align=center|16
|align=center|42
|align=center|54
|align=center|42
|align=center| finals
|align=center|
|align=center|
|align=center|
|-
|align=center|1995–96
|align=center|9
|align=center|34
|align=center|14
|align=center|4
|align=center|16
|align=center|48
|align=center|56
|align=center|46
|align=center bgcolor=tan| finals
|align=center|
|align=center|
|align=center|
|-
|align=center|1996–97
|align=center|15
|align=center|30
|align=center|7
|align=center|3
|align=center|16
|align=center|28
|align=center|57
|align=center|24
|align=center| finals
|align=center|
|align=center|
|align=center bgcolor=red|Relegated
|-bgcolor=LightCyan
|align=center|1997–98
|align=center rowspan=2|2nd
|align=center|14
|align=center|42
|align=center|16
|align=center|7
|align=center|19
|align=center|55
|align=center|53
|align=center|45
|align=center| finals
|align=center|
|align=center|
|align=center|
|-bgcolor=LightCyan
|align=center|1998–99
|align=center|17
|align=center|38
|align=center|11
|align=center|7
|align=center|20
|align=center|34
|align=center|63
|align=center|40
|align=center| finals
|align=center|
|align=center|
|align=center bgcolor=red|Relegated
|-bgcolor=PowderBlue
|align=center|1999–00
|align=center|3rd "C"
|align=center bgcolor=silver|2
|align=center|26
|align=center|18
|align=center|1
|align=center|7
|align=center|44
|align=center|22
|align=center|55
|align=center| finals
|align=center|
|align=center|
|align=center|
|-bgcolor=PowderBlue
|align=center|2000–01
|align=center|3rd "C"
|align=center|14
|align=center|30
|align=center|7
|align=center|7
|align=center|16
|align=center|24
|align=center|38
|align=center|28
|align=center| finals
|align=center|
|align=center|
|align=center bgcolor=pink|Withdrawn
|}

MFC Kremin (2003–2020)
On 23 October 2003, the Kremenchuk city council created a city football team MFC Kremin Kremenchuk.
{|class="wikitable"
|-bgcolor="#efefef"
! Season
! Div.
! Pos.
! Pl.
! W
! D
! L
! GS
! GA
! P
!Domestic Cup
!colspan=2|Europe
!Notes
|-bgcolor=SteelBlue
|align=center|2004
|align=center|4th
|align=center|4
|align=center|6
|align=center|1
|align=center|2
|align=center|3
|align=center|7
|align=center|9
|align=center|5
|align=center|
|align=center|
|align=center|
|align=center|Group 6
|-bgcolor=PowderBlue
|align=center|2005–06
|align=center|3rd "C"
|align=center|9
|align=center|24
|align=center|9
|align=center|6
|align=center|9
|align=center|22
|align=center|34
|align=center|33
|align=center| finals
|align=center|
|align=center|
|align=center|
|-bgcolor=PowderBlue
|align=center|2006–07
|align=center|3rd "B"
|align=center|14
|align=center|28
|align=center|6
|align=center|7
|align=center|15
|align=center|20
|align=center|35
|align=center|25
|align=center| finals
|align=center|
|align=center|
|align=center|
|-bgcolor=PowderBlue
|align=center|2007–08
|align=center|3rd "B"
|align=center|8
|align=center|34
|align=center|14
|align=center|8
|align=center|12
|align=center|49
|align=center|46
|align=center|50
|align=center| finals
|align=center|
|align=center|
|align=center| 
|-bgcolor=PowderBlue
|align=center|2008–09
|align=center|3rd "B"
|align=center|14
|align=center|34
|align=center|10
|align=center|7
|align=center|17
|align=center|43
|align=center|52
|align=center|34
|align=center| finals
|align=center|
|align=center|
|align=center|–3
|-bgcolor=PowderBlue
|align=center|2009–10
|align=center|3rd "B"
|align=center bgcolor=silver|2
|align=center|26
|align=center|15
|align=center|9
|align=center|2
|align=center|41
|align=center|21
|align=center|54
|align=center| finals
|align=center|
|align=center|
|align=center|
|-bgcolor=PowderBlue
|align=center|2010–11
|align=center|3rd "B"
|align=center bgcolor=tan|3
|align=center|22
|align=center|13
|align=center|4
|align=center|5
|align=center|37
|align=center|20
|align=center|43
|align=center| finals
|align=center|
|align=center|
|align=center|
|-bgcolor=PowderBlue
|align=center|2011–12
|align=center|3rd "B"
|align=center|5
|align=center|26
|align=center|16
|align=center|3
|align=center|7
|align=center|34
|align=center|23
|align=center|51
|align=center| finals
|align=center|
|align=center|
|align=center|
|-bgcolor=PowderBlue
|align=center rowspan="2"|2012–13
|align=center|3rd "B"
|align=center|5
|align=center|24 	
|align=center|12 	
|align=center|7 	
|align=center|5 	
|align=center|39 	
|align=center|21 	
|align=center|43
|align=center rowspan=2| finals
|align=center|
|align=center|
|align=center|
|-bgcolor=PowderBlue
|align=center|3rd "2"
|align=center|5
|align=center|34 	
|align=center|12 	 		
|align=center|14 	
|align=center|8 	
|align=center|46 	
|align=center|31 
|align=center|50
|align=center|
|align=center|
|align=center|Promotion Group 2
|-bgcolor=PowderBlue
|align=center|2013–14
|align=center|3rd
|align=center|6
|align=center|36
|align=center|19
|align=center|7
|align=center|10
|align=center|54
|align=center|28
|align=center|64
|align=center| finals
|align=center|
|align=center|
|align=center|
|-bgcolor=PowderBlue
|align=center|2014–15
|align=center|3rd
|align=center bgcolor=tan|3
|align=center|27
|align=center|14
|align=center|6
|align=center|7
|align=center|50
|align=center|30
|align=center|48
|align=center| finals
|align=center|
|align=center|
|align=center|
|-bgcolor=PowderBlue
|align=center|2015–16
|align=center|3rd
|align=center|8
|align=center|26 	
|align=center|11 	
|align=center|7 	
|align=center|8 	
|align=center|43 	
|align=center|31 	
|align=center|40
|align=center| finals
|align=center|
|align=center|
|align=center|
|-bgcolor=PowderBlue
|align=center|2016–17
|align=center|3rd
|align=center bgcolor=tan|3
|align=center|32
|align=center|21
|align=center|5
|align=center|6
|align=center|67
|align=center|29
|align=center|68
|align=center| finals
|align=center|
|align=center|
|align=center bgcolor=lightgreen|Promoted
|-bgcolor=LightCyan
|align=center|2017–18
|align=center|2nd
|align=center|16
|align=center|34
|align=center|9
|align=center|5
|align=center|20
|align=center|25
|align=center|54
|align=center|32
|align=center| finals
|align=center|
|align=center|
|align=center bgcolor=red|Relegated
|-bgcolor=PowderBlue
|align=center|2018–19
|align=center|3rd
|align=center bgcolor=gold|1
|align=center|27
|align=center|18
|align=center|7
|align=center|2
|align=center|48
|align=center|17
|align=center|61
|align=center| finals
|align=center|
|align=center|
|align=center bgcolor=lightgreen|Promoted
|-bgcolor=LightCyan
|align=center|2019–20
|align=center|2nd
|align=center|13
|align=center|30
|align=center|7
|align=center|6
|align=center|17
|align=center|35
|align=center|57
|align=center|27
|align=center| finals
|align=center|
|align=center|
|align=center|
|-bgcolor=LightCyan
|align=center|2020–21
|align=center|2nd
|align=center|
|align=center|
|align=center|
|align=center|
|align=center|
|align=center|
|align=center|
|align=center|
|align=center|
|align=center|
|align=center|
|align=center|
|}

Honours
Ukrainian Second League
 Winners (1): 2018–19
 Runners-up (2): 1999–2000 (Group C), 2009–10 (Group B)

Ukrainian Championship among teams of physical culture
 Winners (1): 1988

Poltava Oblast Cup
 Winners (1): 2004

Poltava Oblast Champions
 Winners (3): 1962, 2004, 2005

References

External links
  Official webpage
  League and Cup History
  USSR Games
  USSR Games

 
Association football clubs established in 1959
Ukrainian First League clubs
1959 establishments in Ukraine
Football clubs in Kremenchuk
Football clubs in the Ukrainian Soviet Socialist Republic